The Door may refer to:

Literature
 The Door (novel), a 1987 novel by Magda Szabó
 The Door (poetry collection), a 2007 book of poetry by Margaret Atwood
 "The Door", a poem by Miroslav Holub
 "The Door", a short story by E. B. White
 The Door, a 1930 novel by Mary Roberts Rinehart
 The Door, the name used by the Christian satire magazine The Wittenburg Door during the 80s, 90s, and early 2000s
 The Door (interstellar teleporter), an interstellar transportation device used in the science fiction works of Lloyd Biggle, Jr.

Film, theatre and television
 The Door (Theatre), a studio theatre in Birmingham, England
 The Door (TV series), a 2010 television series broadcast on British television station ITV1
 The Door (2009 film), a 2009 German film starring Mads Mikkelsen
 The Door, a 2013 short film written and directed by Ava DuVernay
 The Door (2012 film), a 2012 Hungarian film based on the 1987 novel by Magda Szabó
 "The Door" (Game of Thrones), a 2016 episode of Game of Thrones
 The Door (Fear the Walking Dead), an episode of the television series Fear the Walking Dead

Music

Albums
 The Door (Keb' Mo' album), 2000
 The Door (Charlie Daniels album), 1994
 The Door (Mathias Eick album), 2008
 The Door (Steve Lacy album), 1988
 The Door (EP), the debut EP by Turin Brakes

Songs
 "The Door" (George Jones song), a 1974 country song by George Jones
 "The Door" (Silverchair song), a 1997 song by Silverchair from their album Freak Show
 "The Door", a 2018 track by Toby Fox from Deltarune Chapter 1 OST from the video game Deltarune

See also
The Doors, an American band
Door (disambiguation)